Philippe Paviot (born 18 July 1972) is a French bobsledder. He competed in the four man event at the 2002 Winter Olympics.

References

1972 births
Living people
French male bobsledders
Olympic bobsledders of France
Bobsledders at the 2002 Winter Olympics
Sportspeople from Pau, Pyrénées-Atlantiques